The Promised Land (translit.: ha'aretz hamuvtakhat; , translit.: ard al-mi'ad; also known as "The Land of Milk and Honey") is the land which, according to the Tanakh (the Hebrew Bible or the Old Testament), God promised and subsequently gave to Abraham and several more times to his descendants. In modern contexts, the phrase "Promised Land" expresses an image and an idea which is related to the restored homeland for the Jewish people and the concepts of salvation and liberation.

Divine promise 

The concept of the Promised Land is based on verses in the Tanakh (the Hebrew Bible or the Old Testament), in which God speaks to Abraham.

The promises given to Abraham happened prior to the birth of Isaac and were given to all his offspring signified through the rite of circumcision. Johann Friedrich Karl Keil is less clear, as he states that the covenant is through Isaac, but notes that Ishmael's descendants have held much of that land through time.

Mainstream Jewish tradition regards the promise made to Abraham, Isaac and Jacob as having been given to all Jews, including proselytes and in turn their descendants.

The promise that is the basis of the term is contained in several verses of Genesis in the Torah. In  it is said:
The LORD had said to Abram, "Leave your country, your people and your father's household and go to the land I will show you."

and in :
 The LORD appeared to Abram and said, "To your offspring [or seed] I will give this land."

and again in :
On that day the Lord made a covenant with Abram and said, "To your descendants I give this land, from the Wadi of Egypt to the great river, the Euphrates – the land of the Kenites, Kenizzites, Kadmonites, Hittites, Perizzites, Rephaites, Amorites, Canaanites, Girgashites and Jebusites."

The verse is said to describe what are known as "borders of the Land" (Gevulot Ha-aretz).

He later confirms the promise to Abraham's son Isaac, and then to Isaac's son Jacob, who is later renamed "Israel". The Book of Exodus describes the Promised Land in terms of the territory from the River of Egypt to the Euphrates river. The Israelites lived in a smaller area of former Canaanite land and land east of the Jordan River after Moses led the Exodus out of Egypt, and the Book of Deuteronomy presents this occupation as God's fulfillment of the promise. Moses anticipated that God might subsequently give the Israelites land reflecting the boundaries of God's original promise – if they were obedient to the covenant.

Commentary

Commentators have noted several problems with this promise and related ones: 
 It is to Abram's descendants that the land will (in the future tense) be given, not to Abram directly nor there and then. However, in  it is said: He also said to him, "I am the LORD, who brought you out from Ur of the Chaldeans to give you this land to take possession of it." However, how this verse relates to the promises is a matter of controversy. 
 There is nothing in the promise to indicate God intended it be applied to Abraham's physical descendants unconditionally, exclusively (to nobody but these descendants), exhaustively (to all of them) or in perpetuity.

Interpretations

Jewish interpretation
The concept of the Promised Land is the central tenet of Zionism, the Jewish national movement to re-establish the Jewish homeland.

Christian interpretation
In the New Testament, the descent and promise is reinterpreted along religious lines. In the Epistle to the Galatians, Paul the Apostle draws attention to the formulation of the promise, avoiding the term "seeds" in the plural (meaning many people), choosing instead "seed," meaning one person, who, he understands to be Jesus (and those united with him). For example, in Galatians 3:16 he notes: 
 "The promises were spoken to Abraham and to his seed. Scripture does not say "and to seeds," meaning many people, but "and to your seed," meaning one person, who is Christ."

In Galatians 3:28–29 Paul goes further, noting that the expansion of the promise from singular to the plural is not based on genetic/physical association, but a spiritual/religious one: 
"There is neither Jew nor Gentile, neither slave nor free, neither male nor female, for you are all one in Christ Jesus. If you belong to Christ, then you are Abraham's seed, and heirs according to the promise."

In  it is written: 
"It was not through the law that Abraham and his offspring received the promise that he would be heir of the world, but through the righteousness that comes by faith."

Other interpretations

Palestinians also claim partial descent from the Israelites and Maccabees, as well as from other peoples who have lived in the region.

African-American  spirituals invoke the imagery of the "Promised Land" as heaven or paradise
and as an escape from slavery, which could often only be reached by death. The imagery and term also appear elsewhere in popular culture, in sermons, and in speeches such as Martin Luther King Jr.'s 1968 "I've Been to the Mountaintop", in which he said:

I just want to do God's will. And He's allowed me to go up to the mountain. And I've looked over. And I've seen the Promised Land. I may not get there with you. But I want you to know tonight, that we, as a people, will get to the Promised Land. So I'm happy, tonight. I'm not worried about anything. I'm not fearing any man. Mine eyes have seen the glory of the coming of the Lord.

Boundaries from the Book of Numbers 
Boundaries of the 'Promised Land' given in the Book of Numbers (chapter 34)
The South border. —(v. 3) "Then your south quarter shall be from the wilderness of Zin along by the coast of Edom, and your south border shall be the outmost coast of the salt sea eastward : (v. 4) And your border shall turn from the south to the ascent of Akrabbim, and pass on to Zin : and the going forth thereof shall be from the south to Kadesh-barnea, and shall go on to Hazar-addar, and pass on to Azmon : (v. 5) And the border shall fetch a compass from Azmon unto the river of Egypt, and the goings out of it shall be at the sea."
The Western border. —(v. 6) "And as for the western border, ye shall even have the great sea for a border : this shall be your west border." 
The North border. —(v. 7) "And this shall be your north border : from the great sea ye shall point out for you mount Hor : (v. 8) From mount Hor ye shall point out your border unto the entrance of Hamath ; and the goings forth of the border shall be to Zedad : (v 9) And the border shall go on to Ziphron, and the goings out of it shall be at Hazar-enan : this shall be your north border."
The East border. —(v. 10) "And ye shall point out your east border from Hazar-enan to Shepham : (v. 11) And the coast shall go down from Shepham to Riblah, on the east side of Ain ; and the border shall descend, and shall reach unto the side of the sea of Chinnereth eastward : (v. 12) And the border shall go down to Jordan, and the goings out of it shall be at the salt sea : this shall be your land with the coasts thereof round about."
Boundaries of the 'Promised Land' given by Jerome c.400
You may delineate the Promised Land of Moses from the Book of Numbers (ch. 34): as bounded on the south by the desert tract called Sina, between the Dead Sea and the city of Kadesh-barnea, [which is located with the Arabah to the east] and continues to the west, as far as the river of Egypt, that discharges into the open sea near the city of Rhinocolara; as bounded on the west by the sea along the coasts of Palestine, Phoenicia, Coele-Syria, and Cilicia; as bounded on the north by the circle formed by the Taurus Mountains and Zephyrium and extending to Hamath, called Epiphany-Syria; as bounded on the east by the city of Antioch Hippos and Lake Kinneret, now called Tiberias, and then the Jordan River which discharges into the salt sea, now called the Dead Sea.

 1845: Salomon Munk, Palestine, Description Géographique, Historique et Archéologique," in "L'Univers Pittoresque:
Under the name Palestine, we comprehend the small country formerly inhabited by the Israelites, and which is today part of Acre and Damascus pachalics. It stretched between 31 and 33° N. latitude and between 32 and 35° degrees E. longitude, an area of about 1300 . Some zealous writers, to give the land of the Hebrews some political importance, have exaggerated the extent of Palestine; but we have an authority for us that one can not reject. St. Jerome, who had long traveled in this country, said in his letter to Dardanus (ep. 129) that the northern boundary to that of the southern, was a distance of 160 Roman miles, which is about 55 . He paid homage to the truth despite his fears, as he said himself, of availing the Promised Land to pagan mockery, "" (Latin: "I am embarrassed to say the breadth of the promised land, lest we seem to have given the heathen an opportunity of blaspheming").

See also

References 

Hebrew Bible regions
Abraham
African-American cultural history
Book of Genesis
Canaan
Hebrew Bible places
Hebrew Bible words and phrases
Land of Israel
Zionism
Mythical utopias